Cyriogonus is a genus of African crab spiders that was first described by Eugène Louis Simon in 1886.

Species
 it contains six species, found on Madagascar:
Cyriogonus fuscitarsis Strand, 1908 – Madagascar
Cyriogonus lactifer Simon, 1886 (type) – Madagascar
Cyriogonus rutenbergi (Karsch, 1881) – Madagascar
Cyriogonus simoni Lenz, 1891 – Madagascar
Cyriogonus triquetrus Simon, 1886 – Madagascar
Cyriogonus vinsoni (Thorell, 1875) – Madagascar

See also
 List of Thomisidae species

References

Further reading

Araneomorphae genera
Spiders of Madagascar
Thomisidae